Plantlife is the international conservation membership charity working to secure a world rich in wild plants and fungi. It is the only UK membership charity dedicated to conserving wild plants and fungi in their natural habitats and helping people to enjoy and learn about them. HM King Charles III is patron of the charity.

Plantlife works across all key plant ecosystems and habitats focussing on specific habitats and species depending on need.  They promote the importance of all plants and fungi for a sustainable and healthy planet and at present have a particular focus in the UK on grasslands temperate forests due to their acute vulnerability and on at-risk species recovery. Founded in 1989, Plantlife now has 15,000 members and many more supporters.

Plantlife enhances, restores, protects and celebrates natural heritage through working with landowners, other conservation organisations, public sector bodies, the private sector and the wider public. Through their work they connect people with nature so that everyone in society can enjoy and help protect the natural world. They collaborate and influence on the world stage to share their passion and achieve their goals.

Plantlife manages 23 nature reserves across the UK, covering nearly 4,500 acres across England, Scotland, Wales and the Isle of Man. They carry out conservation and outreach work on our own land and in partnership with many others. They advise landowners and publish best practice guidance. They carry out research and gather data to inform government policy. They engage people of all ages and abilities in plant conservation and education and give everybody opportunities to enjoy wildflowers.

Plantlife work overseas by contributing to international conventions on climate and biodiversity and are a registered COP Observer. Working with the Global Partnership for Plant Conservation they were instrumental in the creation of the Global Strategy for Plant Conservation and the initiation of Important Plant Areas across the world – planning their conservation with government and community groups.

Plantlife is governed by a board of 12 trustees and have around 70 staff located across the UK.  They also support a team of 1500 volunteers who work in the field, at events and in our offices.

A registered charity, Plantlife is funded by donations from its members and supporters, through grants and charitable trusts and through its pioneering land management advice and projects.

History
Plantlife was founded in 1989. Its first president was Professor David Bellamy. Peter James was also a founder member and early vice-president.

Its president is Philip Mould OBE and its chairman is Professor David Hill CBE. English gardener and television presenter Rachel De Thame is their vice-president. The chief executive is Ian Dunn, who took over from Marian Spain in 2020.

Function
Plantlife helps run an annual National Plant Monitoring Survey, and a rare species conservation programme, "Back from the Brink". It was a lead partner of HRH the Prince of Wales' Coronation Meadows project.

Although much of Plantlife's work is centred on plants, it is also involved in the conservation of fungi. Its work in this area includes surveying waxcap grasslands and publishing a strategy for conserving fungi in the UK.

The group also has an international programme which includes projects on medicinal plant conservation and sustainable use in the Himalayas and East Africa.

Plantlife Nature Reserves

Plantlife own the following nature reserves:

 Long Herdon and Grange Meadows, Buckinghamshire
 Munsary Peatlands, Caithness
 Cae Blaen-dyffryn, Carmarthenshire
 Greena Moor, Cornwall
 Augill Pasture, Cumbria
 Deep Dale, Derbyshire
 Ryewater Farm, Dorset
 Caeau Tan y Bwlch, Gwynedd
 Davies Meadows, Herefordshire
 Joan's Hill Farm, Herefordshire
 The Lugg Meadows, Herefordshire
 Moaney and Crawyn's Meadows, Isle of Man
 Queendown Warren, Kent
 Ranscombe Farm, Kent
 Thompson Meadow, North Yorkshire
 Winskill Stones, North Yorkshire
 Seaton Meadows, Rutland
 Skylark Meadows, Somerset
 Side Farm Meadows, Staffordshire
 Winks Meadow, Suffolk
 Furnace Meadow and Brick Kiln Rough, West Sussex
 Stockwood Meadows, Worcestershire

County Flowers competition

In 2002 Plantlife ran a competition to select county flowers for all counties of the UK. The general public was invited to vote for the bloom they felt most represented their county. The list was declared in 2004.

Although sometimes contested, all have, to date, stuck. The one exception was the county flower of Norfolk: originally Alexanders won the vote. However, a campaign led by the Eastern Daily Press was successful in requesting a change to the poppy, which was felt to be more representative.

The Back from the Brink programme
Plantlife's "Back from the Brink" programme was initiated in 1991. Its intention was to focus conservation efforts on some of the rarest plant species in Britain. It initially concentrated on vascular plants but was extended to cover non-vascular ("lower") plants and fungi. As of 2006, 101 species are covered by the programme. The programme included survey work to establish information about populations of these species, monitoring of populations to identify change over time and the factors relating to this, research into ecological requirements of the species, and site management work aimed at maintaining or restoring habitat conditions suitable for these species. Since 2008 the programme has gradually expanded to include a much larger list of species, this is in response to the publication of both the UK Red List and UK Biodiversity Action Plan. To effectively deliver conservation of an ever expanding list of rare species the work will be directed at habitats, where it is hoped that suites of species will respond.

Important Plant Areas
In 2007, Plantlife announced the establishment of 150 Important Plant Areas (or IPAs) across the UK. These areas were nominated for their internationally important wild plant populations. Since then they have been actively raising awareness of these ecologically important habitats and encouraging their long-term protection and improvement through the adoption of an 'ecosystem-based' conservation approach.

The IPA programme is endorsed by national conservation organisations including the RSPB and the Wildlife Trusts, and also by UK government bodies including Natural England, Scottish Natural Heritage and the Countryside Council for Wales.

Plantlife's international team has had some success in spreading the concept abroad.

No Mow May
The No Mow May initiative encourages gardeners in the UK to not mow their lawn in the month of May so that plant diversity is increased and nectar can be produced for insects.

See also
 List of extinct plants of the British Isles

References

External links

 Plantlife website
 rECOrd (Local Biological Records Centre for Cheshire)

Environmental charities based in the United Kingdom
Conservation in the United Kingdom
Native plant societies
Organizations established in 1989
Organisations based in Wiltshire
Protected areas of the United Kingdom